The Lebanese Air Force (LAF) is the aerial warfare branch of the Lebanese Armed Forces. The seal of the air force is a Roundel with two wings and a Lebanese Cedar tree, surrounded by two laurel leaves on a blue background.

History
The Lebanese Air Force were established in 1949 under the command of then-Lieutenant Colonel Emile Boustany, who later became commander of the army. Soon after its establishment, a number of aircraft were donated by the British, French, and Italian governments. Britain donated 4 Percival Prentices and 2 World War II-era Percival Proctors, while Italy donated 4 Savoia-Marchetti SM.79 bombers which were mainly used for transportation.
In 1953, jet fighters were introduced when 16 de Havilland Vampire jets were received. The first Hawker Hunters arrived in 1959 and were followed by additional fighters through 1977. In 1968, 12 Mirage IIIELs were delivered from France but were grounded in the late 1970s due to lack of funds. In 2000, the grounded Mirages were sold to Pakistan.

In 2018, the United States government delivered six Embraer EMB 314 Super Tucano to the Lebanese Air Force.

In the absence of advanced fighter aircraft, the air force currently relies on a helicopter force, a squadron of Embraer EMB 314 Super Tucano, and three Cessna AC 208s for the reconnaissance and ground attack roles.

In October 2018, MD Helicopters confirm receipt delivery order of six MD 530F+ for Lebanese air force with estimated delivery schedule on fourth quarter of 2020.

Combat history

The Lebanese Air Forces have a long history operating Hawker Hunter jets since 1958. A Lebanese Hawker Hunter shot down an Israeli jet over Kfirmishki in the early 1960s and its pilot was captured by the Lebanese Armed Forces. During the Six-Day War Two Hawker Hunter strafed Israeli positions in Galilee. One Lebanese Hawker Hunter was shot down by an Israeli Air Force Mirage IIICJ. The Hawker Hunters have not flown any combat sorties since September 17, 1983. This was at a time when the French and Americans were rebuilding the Lebanese Army. Three F.Mk.70s were made airworthy, and resumed combat operations on September 15. Because the main airfield, Rayak Air Base, had been shelled by Syrian forces, the Hunters had to operate from an airfield in Byblos. The Hunters were finally grounded in 1994 after a minor accident with one of the T.66 trainers during landing and the remaining 8 were stored in Rayak. The last loss took place in 1989 near Batroun during routine training, when the undercarriage failed to lower, causing the jet to crash. The pilot ejected safely from the doomed aircraft and landed in the Mediterranean sea, where he was promptly rescued by the Syrian Army, which then handed him over to Suleiman Frangieh, who in turn handed him over to the Lebanese Army at the al-Madfoun crossing.

During operations in the Nahr el-Bared camp in North Lebanon, lacking any airworthy, fixed-wing strike aircraft, the Lebanese Army modified several UH-1H Huey helicopters to permit the carrying of 500 pound Mark 82 and 1000 pound Mark 83 bombs (all unguided iron bombs, also known as dumb bombs) as well as Matra SNEB 68 mm rocket pods (taken from stored Hawker Hunters). Special mounting pads engineered by the Lebanese Army were attached to each Huey on the sides and belly to carry the bombs. The air force, in collaboration with the engineering regiment, developed and used two dumb bomb variants, the 250 kg LAF-GS-ER2 and the 400 kg LAF-GS-ER3. Usually, helicopters cannot bomb using this method, in comparison to ground attack aircraft, so this became one of the rare moments in history during which helicopters were used in such a way. The Lebanese Army also made extensive use of Aérospatiale Gazelles armed with Euromissile HOT anti-tank guided missiles and machine gun pods.

The Lebanese air force played a decisive role throughout the Syrian Civil War spillover in Lebanon, conducting surveillance operations and precision attacks against terrorist groups Al-Nusra Front and Islamic State of Iraq and the Levant who had invaded the border town of Arsal in 2014 and subsequently kept positions along the outskirts of Arsal and al-Qaa, keeping them at bay and severely hindering their movement. Most notably, the air force put their AC-208 Combat Caravans to effective use during the Dawn of the Outskirts operation in 2017, striking terrorist targets with AGM-114 Hellfire missiles and, in a rare display of joint warfare tactics by different branches of the Lebanese Armed Forces, using their laser designators to pinpoint high-value targets for M712 Copperhead shells being used by the First Artillery Regiment deployed along the front.

Squadrons and Air Bases

List of aircraft

Former aircraft

Dassault Falcon 20
Dassault Mirage IIIEL
de Havilland Vampire
de Havilland Dove
de Havilland Canada DHC-1
Fouga CM.170 Magister
Hawker Hunter
Macchi MB.308
Percival Prentice
Percival Proctor
Savoia-Marchetti SM.79
Sud Aviation Alouette III
T6 Texan

References

Military of Lebanon
Air forces by country
Military units and formations established in 1949
1949 establishments in Lebanon